Baltic Basketball League (BBL) was the Baltic states basketball league founded in 2004. The league mainly focused on teams from the Baltic states, but teams from Sweden, Russia, Kazakhstan, Finland, and Belarus have participated in the Baltic League. After the 2017–18 season, the league announced that it was suspending its operations.

History
For the 2015–16 season, the format of the BBL included a regular season composed by two groups of seven teams that competed in a round-robin competition system, with each team facing their opponent twice. The teams qualified for the eight-finals based on their ranking after the regular season. Out of the five teams who participated in FIBA Europe Cup competition – Ventspils, Juventus, Šiauliai, Tartu Ülikool/Rock and Pieno žvaigždės – the latter three did not qualify for the FIBA Europe Cup playoffs and thus started playing at the start of the BBL playoffs, seeded respectively first, second and third based on last season's results. All play-off games are played in home-and-away series.

Baltic Basketball League also featured a Baltic Basketball League Cup competition before the beginning of the regular season since 2008.

Teams
These are the teams that participated in 2017–18 season:

Baltic League champions

Elite Division champions

Challenge Cup champions

BBL Cup winners

Baltic League awards

Statistical leaders
Statistics include regular season and play-off games

Points per game

Rebounds per game

Assists per game

See also
Latvian-Estonian Basketball League

References

External links
 
 Eurobasket.com League Page

 
2004 establishments in Europe
2018 disestablishments in Europe
Basketball leagues in Estonia
Basketball leagues in Latvia
Basketball leagues in Lithuania
Defunct multi-national basketball leagues in Europe
Sport in the Baltic states
Sports leagues established in 2004
Sports leagues disestablished in 2018